Hogan is an Irish surname derived from Irish Ó hÓgáin, a patronymic of Middle Irish ógán, meaning "a youth", in the genitive case (cf. Modern Irish ógánach), itself from óg, "young" (ultimately cognate with English young), with a prothetic h. A surname of the same form was Anglicised as "Hagan" in Ulster. Some southern bearers claim descent from an uncle of Brian Boru, High King of Ireland (1002–1014). Occasionally appears as an absorption of the west Connacht (O')Houghegan (Irish: Ó hEochagáin). Hypothetically derivable from related words in Cornish and Welsh.

People with the surname include:
 Allan Hogan (born 1943), Australian journalist
 Anni Hogan (born 1961), British musician and composer
 Ben Hogan (1912–1997), American golfer
 Blaine Hogan (born 1980), American actor
 Bosco Hogan (fl. late 20th century), Irish actor
 Brian Hogan (disambiguation)
 Brigid Hogan-O'Higgins (born "Hogan", 1932–2022), Irish politician
 Chris Hogan (disambiguation)
 Chuck Hogan, American writer
 Daniel Hogan (Irish politician) (1899–1980), Irish Fianna Fáil politician, TD for Laois-Offaly and later a Senator
 Daniel Hogan (sailor) (died 1818), American naval seaman, namesake of the USS Hogan (DD-178)
 Danny Hogan (1880–1928), American participant in organized crime
 Darrell Hogan, American football player
 David Hogan (composer) (1949–1996), American composer and choir director
 Dennis Hogan, American sociologist
 Desmond Hogan (born 1950), Irish writer
 Dick Hogan (1917–1995), American actor
 Edmond Hogan (1883–1964), Australian politician
 Edward Hogan (1834–1905), New York politician  
 Edward J. Hogan (1885–1963), Missouri politician
 Erin Marie Hogan (born 1985), American actress
 Gabriel Hogan (born 1973), Canadian actor
 Happy Hogan (baseball) (1877–1915), American baseball player
 Hector Hogan (1931–1960), Australian Olympic athlete
 Henry Hogan (1840–1916), American army soldier
 Inez Hogan (1895–1973), American author and book illustrator
 Jack Hogan (born 1929), American actor
 James Hogan (disambiguation)
 Jimmy Hogan (1882–1974), British footballer
 João Hogan (1914–1988), Portuguese artist
 Joe Hogan (born 1938), Scottish footballer
 John Hogan (disambiguation)
 Jonathan Hogan (born 1951), American stage and television actor
 Joseph Lloyd Hogan (1916–2000), American Roman Catholic bishop
 Kevin Hogan (disambiguation)
 Kiera Hogan (1994), American wrestler
 Krishawn Hogan (born 1995), American football player
 Larry Hogan (born 1956), governor of Maryland
 Lawrence Hogan (1928–2017), United States Representative and father of Larry Hogan 
 Lester Hogan (born 1920), American scientist
 Liam Hogan (born 1989), English footballer
 Liam Hogan (hurler) (1939–2014), Irish hurler
 Marc Hogan (born 1981), American journalist
 Marty Hogan (1869–1923), Anglo-American baseball player
 Michael Hogan (1896–1920) Gaelic Football captain, member of the Irish Volunteers & is the namesake of Croke Park's 'Hogan Stand'
 Moses Hogan (1957–2003), American composer and arranger of choral music
 Noel Hogan (born 1971), Irish musician
 Patrick Hogan (disambiguation)
 Paul Hogan (disambiguation)
 Peter Hogan (fl. late 20th century), British comics writer
 Phil Hogan (born 1960), Irish politician
 Raymond Hogan (1932–1995), Australian cricketer
 Robert Hogan (disambiguation)
 Ruth Hogan (born 1961), English novelist
 Scott Hogan, English footballer
 Seán Hogan (1901–1968), Irish Republican  
 Sean Hogan (fl. late 20th century), Canadian singer-songwriter
 Shanna Hogan (1982–2020), American writer
 Shawn Hogan (born 1975), American entrepreneur
 Silas Hogan (1911–1994), American blues musician
 Simon Hogan (born August 1988), Australian rules footballer
 Steve Hogan (1948–2018), American politician
 Thomas F. Hogan (born before 1950), American judge
 Tom Hogan (born 1956), Australian cricketer
 William Hogan (disambiguation)

Stage names
Brooke Hogan, stage name of American singer and reality television personality Brooke Bollea (born 1988), daughter of Hulk Hogan
Horace Hogan, ring name of American professional wrestler Michael Bollea (born 1965), nephew of Hulk Hogan
Hulk Hogan, ring name of American professional wrestler Terry Gene Bollea (born 1953)
Nick Hogan, stage name of American reality television personality Nicholas Bollea (born 1990), son of Hulk Hogan

See also 
 Hagan (disambiguation)
 Håkan, a similar-sounding name
 Hogan (disambiguation)

References 

Anglicised Irish-language surnames
English-language surnames

ru:Хоган (фамилия)